Pakistan Electric Power Company (PEPCO) is a defunct holding company and operates as a division of the Ministry of Water and Power (Pakistan).

History
Pepco was incorporated in 1998 in pursuance of the “Strategic Plan for Restructuring of Pakistan Power Sector” to facilitate the transition process in Wapda power wing and effective corporatization of new entities after unbundling of Wapda. In pursuance of this mandate, Pepco signed a Memorandum of Agreement (MoA) with WAPDA for a period of 2 years. In its defined role, PEPCO is responsible for assisting the Power Division, Ministry of Energy, Government of Pakistan in effectively monitoring and oversight of the Distribution Companies (DISCOs) 

In 2000, WAPDA transferred power distribution companies to Pakistan Electric Power Company (PEPCO) under a reorganization plan of power sector in Pakistan.

In 2021, the headquarters of PEPCO was shifted to Islamabad from Lahore, and it was decided to rename it as Power Planning and Monitoring Company.

Subsidiaries
The following companies comes under PEPCO:
 Distribution companies (DISCOs)
 Power Information Technology Company

References

Government-owned companies of Pakistan
Companies based in Lahore